Senator Saleem H. Mandviwalla (born on 25 January 1959) is a Pakistani politician who served as deputy chairman of the Senate of Pakistan from March 2018 to March 2021. He was previously the president of the Board of Investment and Minister of State for Investment of the Islamic Republic of Pakistan, a position he held from October 2008 till May 2013. Prior to his appointment, he was the president of the Lasbela Chamber of Commerce & Industry in Lasbela, Balochistan. He was appointed Minister of Finance on 19 February 2013 till 7 June 2013. Saleem Mandviwalla was unanimously elected as chairperson for Senate's Standing Committee on Finance, Revenue, Economic Affairs, Statistics and Privatization. Saleem Mandviwalla elected Vice Chairman of Senate of Pakistan on March 12, 2018, with 54 votes out of total 103 votes cast and defeated Usman Khan Kakar who secured only 44 votes. To be elected for the seat of Vice Chairman Senate, candidate had to secure at least 53 votes from the house of 104.
On 1 August 2019, a no-confidence motion was presented by the government in the senate to remove him from the post of the Deputy Chairman of the Senate, but the motion failed. The government couldn't get enough required votes to remove him from the post.

Early life and education
Mandviwalla was born on 25 January 1959 in Karachi, to a Urdu-speaking Gujarati Muslim family. His parents had migrated from Mandvi, Gujarat 
after Partition Of India. He graduated from Fort Worth School of Aviation in Texas, USA in 1981 and authorized with a commercial Pilot's license from the United States of America.

Business career
Mr. Saleem H. Mandviwalla comes from a well known business family after completing his education he focused on endorsing his family business. Mandviwalla family is in the real estate business in Karachi and other cities of Pakistan since 1921. The family expanded their business to different trades locally and internationally and owned businesses in the manufacturing, media, entertainment and automotive sectors. The family also owns a plastic factory in Hub, Baluchistan.

Chairman Board of Investment (BOI):

Mandviwala was appointed as Chairman, Board of Investment on 9 October 2008. And facilitated business investors nationally and internationally and help the business community to excel the markets globally and develop soft efficacious image of Pakistan

Chairman Lasbela Chamber of Commerce, Balochistan:

He worked as President for the Chamber in the years between 2004–2006. And developed B2B links for the peace and prosperity of the province, in greater interest of the country.

Political career

He is a renown-owned politician from Sindh and served Pakistan Peoples Party since 90's period. Mr. Mandviwalla has remained an active party worker on provincial and national level.

Member of Senate of Pakistan (Senator):

Fortune smiled on him on 2012, when PPP's Dr Asim Hussain, a close aide to the then President Zardari, had to resign from the Senate. Mr Mandviwalla then won a by-election on a PPP ticket for the upper house of parliament from Sindh. Saleem Mandviwala was elected as Senator, Senate of Pakistan on 8 November 2012 against a General Seat from Sindh province on the ticket of PPPP. After serving for a three-year term in senate Mr. Mandviwalla was elected as Chairman, Senate Standing Committee on Finance, Revenue, Economic Affairs, Statistics and Privatization on 11 May 2015. During that term he transparently and in bi-partisan way resist to governmental pressure and resolved many financial issues for greater public interest. He has also served as a member of Business Advisory Committee.

Minister of Finance Division:

Mr. Saleem Mandviwalla was appointed as Minister of State for Finance Division, Government of Pakistan on 13 November 2012. A few days later, the then finance minister Hafeez Shaikh, resigned in early 2013 and he was appointed as Federal Minister for Finance, Government of Pakistan on 19 February 2013. He was also a Member of National Finance Commission (NFC) on 24 April 2015 to represent Govt. of Sindh.

Deputy Chairman Senate:

The Opposition-backed Sadiq Sanjrani on Monday 12 March 2018 bagged a lion's share of votes to be elected Senate chairman while Saleem Mandviwalla became deputy chairman of the upper house of Parliament. Sanjrani secured 57 votes while PML-N candidate Raja Zafarul Haq received 46 votes. Similarly, Mandviwalla secured 54 against Usman Kakar's 44 votes. He defeated Usman Kakar, the candidate put up by the PML-N and its allies, in the election for Senate's deputy chairman on Monday March 13, 2018. He is simultaneously holding the Chair of Senate House Committee and deals with Parliamentary dealings effectively.
On August 1, 2019, a resolution was put in Senate of Pakistan from tabled by the government for the Removal of Deputy Chairman Senate, but Saleem Mandviwala  survived a no-confidence resolution and stand as Deputy Chairman Senate till date

Recognizing Israel 
On 19 June 2022, Mandviwalla said that Pakistan must do what is in country's own best interest, while commenting on potential ties with Israel. He insisted not to stop dialogue and trade with any country including Israel. He also said that the people criticize Israel but we have to look after our own interests.

References

|-

1958 births
Finance Ministers of Pakistan
Living people
Pakistani people of Gujarati descent
Pakistani senators (14th Parliament)
Deputy chairmen of the Senate of Pakistan